Wiseton is a small village, country estate and civil parish, Nottinghamshire, England, situated between the villages of Gringley-on-the-Hill and Everton, approximately  southeast of Bawtry and  west of Gainsborough. There is also a nearby hamlet called New Wiseton. The Chesterfield Canal flows nearby, and there are several bridges in the vicinity.

History
The earlier hall was built in 1771 and was demolished in 1960. The estate belonged to the Acklom family before belonging to the wealthy aristocratic Spencer family. In 1832, the country estate at Wiseton covered 930 acres, 872 of which belonged at the time to John Spencer, 3rd Earl Spencer of Althorp. Spencer owned Holbein, Barlow and Caravaggio paintings at the "handsome" house.

At the time of John Marius Wilson's Imperial Gazetteer of England and Wales (1870–72), Wiseton had a population of 124 people with 24 houses.

Wiseton Hall was the home of Sir Joseph Laycock in the early 20th century, and cricketer Harry Elliott was once employed here. Richard Budge, former owner of RJB Mining, lived at the Hall.

References

 
Hamlets in Nottinghamshire
Civil parishes in Nottinghamshire
Bassetlaw District